is a city located in Miyazaki Prefecture, Japan.

Ebino shares borders with Kagoshima Prefecture, Kumamoto Prefecture and Kobayashi, Miyazaki Prefecture.

As of June 1, 2019, the city has an estimated population of 18,337 and a population density of 64.8 persons per km². The total area is 282.93 km².

History
The town of Ebino was created through the administrative merging of the towns of Masaki, Kakutō and Īno in 1966. Ebino was designated a city on December 1, 1970.

Geography
 Ebino is the 8th physically largest city in Miyazaki Prefecture.
 Inhabitable land: 8,256 Hectares (1 October 2004)
 Forestland: 20,044 Hectares (1 February 2005)

Climate
Ebino has a humid subtropical climate (Köppen climate classification Cfa) with hot, humid summers and cool winters.

Demographics
Per Japanese census data, the population of Ebino in 2020 is 17,638 people. Ebino has been conducting censuses since 1920.

Economy

Commerce
Ebino produces a wide range of food products, from shōchū to sweets, tea, honey, mushrooms, chicken and pork.  Locally produced crafts include Ebino-yaki pottery and bamboo craftwork, among others.

Transportation

Car
Ebino can be reached via the Kyūshū Expressway as well as national highway routes 221, 268, and 447.

Express Bus
Ebino is also accessible via express and regular buses.

Train
The following train lines and stations operate in Ebino.
 Kitto Line
 Ebino Īno Station
 Ebino Uwae Station
 Ebino Station
 Kyomachi Onsen Station
 Hisatsu Line
 Masaki Station

Education

Elementary schools
 Ino Elementary
 Ino Elementary Branch School
 Okobira Elementary
 Uwae Elementary
 Kakutou Elementary
 Kakutou Elementary Obeno Branch School
 Masaki Elementary
 Okamoto Elementary

Junior high schools
 Ino Junior High School
 Uwae Junior High School
 Kakuto Junior High School
 Masaki Junior High School

Senior High Schools
 Ino Senior High School
 Ebino-Kōgen International High School

Colleges
 Ebino-Kōgen International College

Culture

Major Festivals and Events

Facilities
 Ebino International Center
 Ebino Cultural Center
 Ebino VLF transmitter, a large facility for broadcasting messages to submerged submarines.

References

External links
 Ebino City official website 
 Ebino City official website 
 Ebino City photo gallery 
 Green Net Ebino 
 Ebino-Kougen International High School 
 Ebino-Kougen International College

Cities in Miyazaki Prefecture